The 2023 TCR World Tour, for sponsorship reasons also called Kumho Tyres TCR World Tour is the inaugural season of the TCR World Tour.

The season is planned to start on 28 April in Autódromo Internacional do Algarve, Portugal and to end on 19 November in Guia Circuit, Macau.

Calendar

Teams and drivers

Notes

References

External links
 

World
WTCR
2023